In algebraic geometry, the dimension of a scheme is a generalization of a dimension of an algebraic variety. Scheme theory emphasizes the relative point of view and, accordingly, the relative dimension of a morphism of schemes is also important.

Definition 
By definition, the dimension of a scheme X is the dimension of the underlying topological space: the supremum of the lengths ℓ of chains of irreducible closed subsets:

In particular, if  is an affine scheme, then such chains correspond to chains of prime ideals (inclusion reversed) and so the dimension of X is precisely the Krull dimension of A.

If Y is an irreducible closed subset of a scheme X, then the codimension of Y in X is the supremum of the lengths ℓ of chains of irreducible closed subsets:

An irreducible subset of X is an irreducible component of X if and only if the codimension of it in X is zero. If  is affine, then the codimension of Y in X is precisely the height of the prime ideal defining Y in X.

Examples 
If a finite-dimensional vector space V over a field is viewed as a scheme over the field, then the dimension of the scheme V is the same as the vector-space dimension of V.
Let , k a field. Then it has dimension 2 (since it contains the hyperplane  as an irreducible component). Thus,  for closed points x can vary.
Let  be an algebraic pre-variety; i.e., an integral scheme of finite type over a field .
Let R be a discrete valuation ring and  the affine line over it. Let  be the projection.  consists of 2 points,  corresponding to the maximal ideal and closed and  the zero ideal and open. Then the fibers  are closed and open, respectively. Thus, the dimension of the closure of an open subset can be strictly bigger than that of the open set.
Continuing the same example, let  be the maximal ideal of R and  a generator. The first ideal  is maximal since  the field of fractions of R. Also,  has height one by Krull's principal ideal theorem and  has height two since . Consequently,
 
while X is irreducible.

Equidimensional scheme
An equidimensional scheme (or, pure dimensional scheme) is a scheme all of whose irreducible components are of the same dimension (implicitly assuming the dimensions are all well-defined).

Examples
All irreducible schemes are equidimensional.

In affine space, the union of a line and a point not on the line is not equidimensional. In general, if two closed subschemes of some scheme, neither containing the other, have unequal dimensions, then their union is not equidimensional.

If a scheme is smooth (for instance, étale) over Spec k for some field k, then every connected component (which is then in fact an irreducible component), is equidimensional.

Relative dimension 
If all the nonempty fibers  are purely of the same dimension , then one says that  is of relative dimension .

See also 
Kleiman's theorem
Glossary of scheme theory
Equidimensional ring

Notes

References

External links 

Algebraic geometry